Vince Sorrenti (born 21 March 1961) is an Australian stand-up comedian, writer and television presenter from Punchbowl, New South Wales. He is of Italian descent. Sorrenti performs nationally and internationally. He performs at sports hospitality, charity events, corporate events, club venues and private parties. He performs, MCs, and facilitates at around 200 events per year.

Career
Whilst studying Architecture at Sydney University, he played rugby union and featured heavily in the acclaimed Architecture Revues over many years. It was here and at the newly opened Sydney Comedy Store that Sorrenti cut his teeth as a performer.

In the late 1980s, Sorrenti lived and worked as a stand-up comic in New York City. Spotted by MTV, he became the host of the national Big Blank Show, a live variety/video show which aired nightly from Monday to Thursday. Vince Sorrenti has appeared on numerous talk shows on Australian TV over the last three decades, including Tonight Live with Steve Vizard, Russell Gilbert Live, The AFL Footy Show, and Q&A. He began hosting the Australian version of the game show Let's Make a Deal in 1990.

Between 2001 and 2007, Sorrenti appeared in several episodes as the lawyer in the comedy series Fat Pizza and the movie Fat Pizza vs. Housos, which is an Australian film based on the combination of the stories and characters of the SBS series Fat Pizza and the comedy series Housos.

In recent years he has appeared on Australian Celebrity Apprentice, Skating on Thin Ice, Wide Open Road, 20 to 1, Studio 10, and many others.

Vince Sorrenti has co-written two films. The first was the publicly funded training film entitled No Laughing Matter (1991). It focused on global environmental sustainability, and Sorrenti played all seven characters in the film. He was nominated for awards at the Berlin and New York film festivals and was Awarded Best Training Film at Berlin Film Awards. In the same year he co-wrote with Larry Buttrose a feature film entitled Gino (1994). The screenplay was awarded full funding by the FFC (Film Finance Corporation). It received a limited release and was nominated for an AFI Award (now known as an AACTA Award) for Production Design in 1994.

Whilst studying Architecture at Sydney University, he played Rugby Union and became a keen advocate of student causes. During this time, on annual retreats to Don Hearn's Health Cabins at Munyana on the New South Wales south coast, his eclectic style of stand-up comedy was born. His catch-phrase, "Unbelievable!", is the product of firm friendships within the Australian Customs Service, evolved during these sabbaticals. A gregarious raconteur, he also enjoys an occasional quiet beer at his favourite haunt, the Star Hotel in Milton, or fresh shucked oysters from Don Hearn's private lease.

Donny was an amiable mentor and Vince was deeply affected by his passing. Each year on the anniversary of his death, Vince re-enacts Donny's Saturday-night Land Rover drive to Bendalong bottle shop, with the pet magpie perched on the steering wheel supposedly calling the shots. The alacrity of believing a magpie needs chocolates (really for Donny's mistress back at the caravan) amused Vince immensely.

Sorrenti has represented many brands over the years. He is currently the face of Tyreright and Allhomes.

In August 2018, Sorrenti was announced as a presenter on the new Nine Network travel series Helloworld, which debuted on 7 October 2018. Sorrenti premiered in episode 1 as the Italy and France travel reporter. After the second season, the show was put on hold due to the COVID-19 pandemic.

Controversy 
An advertisement that Sorrenti did for Tyreright was pulled from the air after the Advertising Standards Boards deemed the characterisation of an Asian man as "racist stereotyping". In the ad, Sorrenti "explains the benefits of using Tyreright to an Asian man standing in front of what appears to be a rice field, who then asks in broken English if the process of fitting a tyre will take a ‘wong’ time".

In December 2021, Sorrenti apologised for changing a line of "That's Amore" to "When you're hit by a thug in a tough Kiwi pub, that's a Māori" on the radio station 2GB. The line elicited anger in some of the Australian Māori community, with Sorrenti saying, through an agent: "That humour is outdated and unacceptable" and that he'd be retiring the joke.

Discography

Albums

Awards

ARIA Music Awards
The ARIA Music Awards are a set of annual ceremonies presented by Australian Recording Industry Association (ARIA), which recognise excellence, innovation, and achievement across all genres of the music of Australia. They commenced in 1987. 

! 
|-
| 1987 || Unbelievable || ARIA Award for Best Comedy Release ||  || 
|-

Mo Awards
The Australian Entertainment Mo Awards (commonly known informally as the Mo Awards), were annual Australian entertainment industry awards. They recognise achievements in live entertainment in Australia from 1975 to 2016. Vince Sorrenti won four awards in that time.
 (wins only)
|-
| 1994
| Vince Sorrenti
| New-Wave Comedy Performer of the Year 
| 
|-
| 1996
| Vince Sorrenti
| New-Wave Comedy Performer of the Year 
| 
|-
| 1998
| Vince Sorrenti
| New-Wave Comedy Performer of the Year
| 
|-
| 2010
| Vince Sorrenti
| Rodney Rude Stand-up Performer of the Year
| 
|-

External links

Official site
Sorrenti's speaker bio at ICMI
Tyreright Tyre Stores

References

1961 births
Australian people of Italian descent
Australian stand-up comedians
University of Sydney alumni
The Apprentice Australia candidates
People from Sydney
Living people
Australian television presenters